Ubuntu-Med is collaborative medical education community linking medical schools, residency and fellowship programs in creating shared educational resources for physician and patient education.

Packages 
Ubuntu-Med includes packages in the following categories:

 Medical Education:

Educational Topics
Case Reports
Journal Club
Clinical Images
Multimedia

 Knowledge Assessment
Patient Education:

Videos
Articles

Availability 
Ubuntu-Med is available as an online platform.

See also 
 Debian-Med – a Debian Pure Blend
 Electronic health record
 Health informatics

References

External links 
 Ubuntu-Med – Homepage of the Project
 Ubuntu-Med – Official Website 

Ubuntu derivatives
Health care software
Bioinformatics software